Jackin' for Beats is the debut mixtape from rapper and actor O'Shea Jackson Jr. (OMG), son of the rapper Ice Cube. The 10-track mixtape was hosted by DJ Crazy Toones, the official DJ for Ice Cube and WC. OMG's debut was on his father's album I Am the West with his brother Doughboy. In this mixtape, OMG shows similarities to his father's tone, enunciation and humor, while adding his own vocals over some of the standout tracks of today.

Track listing

Instrumental listing

References

2012 mixtape albums
Gangsta rap albums by American artists
Albums produced by Dr. Dre